Yeheskel Bar-Ness is a Distinguished Professor Emeritus at New Jersey Institute of Technology (NJIT).

Education
Bar-Ness received a bachelor's and a master's degree in electrical engineering from the Technion in Haifa, Israel, and a doctorate from Brown University.

Career
Bar-Ness published more than 200 papers in his professional life over 40 year. He had one U.S. patent on smart antennas.

His research was funded by the National Science Foundation, the New Jersey Commission on Science and Technology, the United States Army, the United States Air Force and the Naval Oceanic Center.

He was the Founding Editor-in Chief of the journal of IEEE Communications Letters.

He made research contributions on adaptive multiuser detection, array processing and interference cancellation, and wireless mobile and personal communications.

Honors and awards
 Fellow of the Institute of Electrical and Electronics Engineers (IEEE).
 Recipient of the Kaplan Prize (1973).
 Named an Inventor of the Year by the New Jersey Inventors Hall of Fame (2006).
 NJIT Excellence in Research Lifetime Achievement Award (2014)

Doctoral students
According to the Mathematics Genealogy Project, Bar-Ness advised 23 doctoral students at Tel Aviv University, University of Pennsylvania and New Jersey Institute of Technology.

References

External links
'New Jersey Institute of Technology : Experts Database -- For the Media - Yeheskel Bar-Ness'
"NJIT : Electrical and Computer Engineering Department -- Our People - Yeheskel Bar-Ness"

Living people
Year of birth missing (living people)
University of Pennsylvania faculty
Brown University alumni
New Jersey Institute of Technology faculty
Fellow Members of the IEEE
Technion – Israel Institute of Technology alumni
Place of birth missing (living people)
Academic staff of Tel Aviv University
American electrical engineers